Alan Pires da Graça (born 4 January 1993), commonly known as Alan Pires, is a Brazilian footballer who plays as a left back for Duque de Caxias.

Career

Club
On 14 February 2018, Alan Pires signed an 18-month contract with Armenian Premier League club FC Alashkert. On 1 March, Alashkert announced that Alan Pires had moved to fellow Armenian Premier League club Ararat Yerevan on loan for the remainder of the season.

Career statistics

Club

Notes

References

1993 births
Living people
Brazilian footballers
Brazilian expatriate footballers
Association football defenders
Campeonato Brasileiro Série C players
Campeonato de Portugal (league) players
Campeonato Brasileiro Série D players
Challenger Pro League players
Armenian Premier League players
Clube Atlético Joseense players
Vila Nova Futebol Clube players
Duque de Caxias Futebol Clube players
Madureira Esporte Clube players
S.U. Sintrense players
Clube Recreativo e Atlético Catalano players
Grêmio Esportivo Glória players
A.F.C. Tubize players
FC Alashkert players
FC Ararat Yerevan players
America Football Club (Rio de Janeiro) players
Nacional Atlético Clube (Patos) players
Ferroviário Atlético Clube (CE) players
Brazilian expatriate sportspeople in Portugal
Brazilian expatriate sportspeople in Belgium
Expatriate footballers in Portugal
Expatriate footballers in Belgium
Expatriate footballers in Armenia
Footballers from Rio de Janeiro (city)